Clauder's Pharmacy was a historic building in Cincinnati, Ohio. It was listed in the National Register of Historic Places on August 24, 1979. The address of the site is 4026 Eastern Avenue.

See also
 Historic preservation
 L.B. Robb Drugstore
 National Register of Historic Places listings in eastern Cincinnati

References

External links
 

National Register of Historic Places in Cincinnati
Buildings and structures in Cincinnati